Mona Dahle (born 24 August 1970) is a Norwegian team handball player and Olympic medalist, born in Trondheim. She received silver medals at the 1992 Summer Olympics in Barcelona with the Norwegian national team. Mona Dahle played 114 games for the national team during her career, scoring 151 goals.

References

External links

1970 births
Living people
Norwegian female handball players
Olympic silver medalists for Norway
Olympic handball players of Norway
Handball players at the 1992 Summer Olympics
Handball players at the 1996 Summer Olympics
Sportspeople from Trondheim
Olympic medalists in handball
Medalists at the 1992 Summer Olympics